Karen D. Beyer (born June 15, 1962) is a U.S. Republican politician and former member of the Pennsylvania House of Representatives 131st District. She was elected in a special election on July 19, 2005.

Personal
Beyer graduated from the College of William and Mary and is a veteran of the United States Air Force.

Beyer lives in Lower Saucon Township, with her husband, a pilot with United Airlines and retired Air Force lieutenant colonel, and their three children.

References

External links

1962 births
Living people
21st-century American women
Republican Party members of the Pennsylvania House of Representatives
People from Jeannette, Pennsylvania
Politicians from Northampton County, Pennsylvania
United States Air Force airmen
Women state legislators in Pennsylvania
Women in the United States Air Force